Radichkov Peak rises to 500 m in Levski Ridge, Tangra Mountains, eastern Livingston Island in the South Shetland Islands, Antarctica.  The peak overlooks Srebarna Glacier to the southwest and Magura Glacier to the northeast and has steep and ice-free eastern slopes. An offshoot extending 900 m in south direction ends up in Kalofer Peak, forming M'Kean Point to the southeast.

The peak is named after the Bulgarian writer Yordan Radichkov (1929–2004).

Location

Maps
 L.L. Ivanov et al. Antarctica: Livingston Island and Greenwich Island, South Shetland Islands. Scale 1:100000 topographic map. Sofia: Antarctic Place-names Commission of Bulgaria, 2005.
 L.L. Ivanov. Antarctica: Livingston Island and Greenwich, Robert, Snow and Smith Islands. Scale 1:120000 topographic map.  Troyan: Manfred Wörner Foundation, 2009.

References
 Radichkov Peak. SCAR Composite Antarctic Gazetteer
 Bulgarian Antarctic Gazetteer. Antarctic Place-names Commission. (details in Bulgarian, basic data in English)

External links
 Radichkov Peak. Copernix satellite image

Tangra Mountains